Renegade is an American white supremacist, conspiracy theory and anti-Semitic media platform, based in Deltona, Florida. Founded by Kyle Hunt, the project consists of two main outlets; Renegade Broadcasting, an internet radio network founded in October 2012 and Renegade Tribune, founded in 2013. The project severed its links with an older media network Oracle Broadcasting. 

Renegade has promoted Holocaust denial, and has portrayed the Third Reich and Adolf Hitler's NSDAP in a positive light, claiming that Germans, not Jews, were the victims of the Second World War. In 2014, founder Kyle Hunt promoted "the White Man March", advocating that White people across the world spontaneously protest in public with signs bearing phrases related to the white genocide conspiracy theory.

Renegade has criticized Donald Trump and Vladimir Putin. It claims that both homosexuality and misogyny are rife within the alt-right and alt-lite. Renegade has also covered such topics as 9/11 conspiracy theories, Pizzagate and flat earth theories. Notable contributors include Michael McLaughlin, former leader of the British Movement. Renegade has associated itself with European paganism and has been strongly critical of Christianity.

As of August 2018, Renegade Tribune had a global Alexa ranking of 77,269. Renegade has been banned from Twitter and YouTube.

History

Renegade was founded by Kyle Christopher Hunt (born November 18, 1983) of Massachusetts who previously worked in the tech industry. Prior to Renegade, Hunt had begun blogging about New Age and conspiracy theories in August 2009 with a WordPress blog and later a BlogTalkRadio podcast under the name Star Theory.

Hunt's Star Theory radio show began to be carried by the Oracle Broadcasting network in April 2012. This network, co-founded by Doug Owen and Lee Rogers (who would later reappear as a writer for Andrew Anglin's The Daily Stormer) covered anti-Semitic conspiracy theories and similar. Hunt's Star Theory began to focus on race and the white genocide conspiracy theory, As well as historical revisionism about the Third Reich (although it ridiculed American neo-Nazism as supposedly "controlled opposition"). While anti-Jewish sentiment was permitted on Oracle Broadcasting, white nationalism and Holocaust denial. Hunt, as well as Michael Titorenko (under the name "Mike Sledge") of Deconstructions Live, were subsequently expelled from the network in October 2012.

Also in October 2012, Hunt began the internet radio network Renegade Broadcasting. In 2013, this outlet expanded with the website Renegade Tribune. Hunt runs Renegade with his partner Sineád Anne McCarthy of New York.

From 2013 into 2014, the Renegade Broadcasting shows featured Hunt, Titorenko, "Siegfried", and "Dana Antiochus" (alias of Dana Roccapriore). In October 2013, the group released a documentary of a toure they called the "Renegade Roadshow", which had been crowd-funded via IndieGoGo. The documentary included appearances by Kevin MacDonald, Charles Krafft and John Morgan, among others. The cover-art for the documentary features racist caricatures, and depicted Mark Potok of the Southern Poverty Law Center tied to the roof of a car.

White Man March

In March 2014, Hunt and Renegade promoted the idea of a "White Man March", where autonomous groups of white people were supposed to go out in public places on that day with placards and leaflets bearing phrases such as "Diversity = White Genocide", at undisclosed locations. At the time of the march, Hunt said he was a supporter of William Daniel Johnson's American Freedom Party. Hunt planned to hold the event in New York City, where he lived at the time. He encouraged people to dress in "a pair of light khakis and a nice dress shirt" as part of their public relations. According to David Neiwert of the Southern Poverty Law Center, the event attracted negligible numbers of people, but had gatherings in New York City, Florence, Kentucky, Tempe, Arizona, Birmingham, Alabama, Branson, Missouri and Olympia, Washington. According to Neiwert, the autonomous march in Kentucky, organized by former National Alliance leader Robert Ransdell, was subject to particular derision due to the presence of two unidentified individuals in Ku Klux Klan uniforms. Hunt had planned to advocate these kind of events monthly, but changed his mind in April 2014.

Following the White Man March, Titorenko publicly broke with Hunt, and several other contributors had also left. Hunt expanded and recruited other former Oracle Broadcasting hosts as replacements and moved from hosting on BlogTalkRadio to hosting their content on their own site.

References

External links
 RenegadeBroadcasting.com
 RenegadeTribune.com

2012 establishments in New York (state)
Alt-right websites
Anti-Christian sentiment in the United States
Conspiracist media
American radio networks
American political blogs
White genocide conspiracy theory
Holocaust-denying websites
Internet properties established in 2012
Neo-Nazi organizations in the United States
Neo-Nazi websites
Political Internet forums
Deltona, Florida
Modern pagan websites